Lipa is a small dispersed settlement in the hills north of Krašnja in the Municipality of Lukovica in the eastern part of the Upper Carniola region of Slovenia.

References

External links

Lipa on Geopedia

Populated places in the Municipality of Lukovica